Abbadia El Mustapha is a former Moroccan soccer player who played in the NASL.

Career statistics

Club

Notes

References

Living people
Moroccan footballers
Moroccan expatriate footballers
Association football forwards
Montreal Olympique players
North American Soccer League (1968–1984) players
Expatriate soccer players in Canada
Moroccan expatriate sportspeople in Canada
Year of birth missing (living people)